Both Sides Now is the eighth studio album by Australian country music artist Adam Harvey. The album was released in October 2009 and peaked at number 19 on the ARIA Charts.
  
At the ARIA Music Awards of 2010, the album was nominated for the ARIA Award for Best Country Album.

Track listing

Charts

Weekly charts

Year-end charts

Certifications

Release history

References

2009 albums
Adam Harvey albums
Covers albums
Albums produced by Rod McCormack
Sony Music Australia albums